Cecil Boyce Perkins (December 1, 1940 – October 28, 2021) was an American Major League Baseball pitcher who appeared in two games for the New York Yankees in . He posted a 0–1 record with a 9.00 earned run average in five full innings pitched. His professional baseball career lasted seven years (1962–1968), all in the Yankee organization.

The Baltimore native attended Salem University and Shepherd University, both in West Virginia. He appeared in 116 games in the minor leagues, 102 as a starting pitcher. His MLB trial occurred in July 1967. In his debut, July 5 against the contending Minnesota Twins, he started against Jim Kaat, surrendered five hits and five earned runs in three innings, and was charged with the eventual 10–4 defeat. Three days later, against the Baltimore Orioles, he threw two scoreless innings of relief to lower his career ERA to 9.00. He surrendered six total hits (including a home run to Rich Reese) and two bases on balls in the majors, with one strikeout.

References

External links

1940 births
2021 deaths
Baseball players from Baltimore
Columbus Confederate Yankees players
Florida Institute for Human and Machine Cognition people
Greensboro Yankees players
Harlan Smokies players
Idaho Falls Yankees players
New York Yankees players
Major League Baseball pitchers
Shelby Yankees players
Shepherd Rams baseball players
Syracuse Chiefs players